The Marashiyan or Marashis (Mazandarani: مرعشیون) were an Iranian Sayyid Twelver Shiʿite dynasty of Mazandarani origin, ruling in Mazandaran from 1359 to 1596. The dynasty was founded by Mir-i Buzurg, a Sayyid native to Dabudasht. Their capitals were Amol, Sari, and Vatashan.

Sources

External links 

 

 
Rulers of Tabaristan
Iranian Muslim dynasties
Alid dynasties
States and territories disestablished in the 1590s